Eressa is a genus of moths in the family Erebidae. The genus was erected by Francis Walker in 1854.

Species

References

External links

 
Syntomini
Moth genera